Woman to Woman (Spanish: De mujer a mujer) is a 1950 Spanish historical drama film directed by Luis Lucia and starring Amparo Rivelles, Ana Mariscal and Eduardo Fajardo. It was not very successful at the box office. It is set in the nineteenth century, and was part of a group of costume films released by Spain's biggest studio CIFESA during the period.

The film portrays the emotional bond that develops between the wife and the mistress of a man.

Plot 
After a family disgrace Isabel needs internment in a mental residence. Her nurse will be her confident, the link to her husband and the outside world.

Cast
 Amparo Rivelles as Isabel  
 Ana Mariscal as Enfermera Emilia  
 Eduardo Fajardo as Luis  
 Manuel Luna as Padre Víctor 
 Mariano Asquerino as Pediatra  
 Francisco Bernal as José, cochero  
 Irene Caba Alba as Enferma mental 1  
 Lola del Pino as Soledad, a maid  
 Fernando Fernández de Córdoba as Doctor Hernández  
 Manolo Fábregas as Javier  
 Manuel Guitián as Herrero  
 Juana Mansó as Enferma mental 2  
 Arturo Marín as Viandante  
 Eloísa Muro as Vicenta - Isabel's mother  
 Antonio Riquelme as Gutiérrez  
 Rosario Royo as enfermera Adela  
 Selica Torcal as Maribel  
 Jesús Tordesillas as Antonio - Isabel's father

References

Bibliography 
 Mira, Alberto. The Cinema of Spain and Portugal. Wallflower Press, 2005.

External links 
 

1950 films
1950s Spanish-language films
Films directed by Luis Lucia
Cifesa films
1950s historical drama films
Spanish historical drama films
Films set in the 19th century
Films scored by Juan Quintero Muñoz
1950 drama films
Spanish black-and-white films
1950s Spanish films